Jesse August is a Belizean professional footballer who plays as a forward for Verdes and the Belize national team.

He debuted internationally on 30 March 2021, and scored his first goal for Belize against Turks and Caicos Islands in a 5–0 victory.

References

External links
 

Living people
Belizean footballers
Belize international footballers
Association football forwards
People from Belmopan
2001 births